Patrick Henry High School is a public high school in Glade Spring, Virginia. It was built in 1960 as a result of the consolidation of Glade Spring High School and Meadowview High School and named after Founding Father Patrick Henry.  The school is located on a 32 acre campus in Glade Spring, Virginia.
.

Clubs & Organizations
Rebel Rampage Club
Drama Club
FBLA (Future Business Leaders of America)
FCA (Fellowship of Christian Athletes)
FFA (Future Farmers of America)
Classics Club
Heritage Club
Key Club
National Honor Society
Science Club
4-H Club
The Patrick Henry Athenaeum
The Rowdy Rebel Club
Book Club
The Guitar Club
Kickball Club
Archery Club
The Gifted And Talented Education Program (GATE)

Education - Scores
Patrick Henry High is recognized in the National Rankings as a top 10% High School in the Country; and earned a Bronze-Medal for this recognition. Schools are ranked based on their performance on state-required tests and how well they prepare students for college. Patrick Henry High School ranks in the top 3,000 schools in the country.  Patrick Henry High School first received this award in 2015. The school has a 100% graduation rate and 38% of students are in at least one AP course.

Athletic

Patrick Henry competed in Group AA Southwest District and Highlands District before moving to Group A Hogoheegee District in 1989, due to declining student enrollment.

Patrick Henry currently offers the following sports:
 Baseball
 Basketball (Men's and Women's)
Cheerleading
Cross Country - Girls State Champs in 1991
Football
Golf
Soccer
Softball - State Runner-up 2017
Swimming
Track and Field - Girls State Champs in 1996; Boys State Champs 2017
Volleyball  -  State Champs 2018
Wrestling
Scholastic Bowl

Notable alumni
Israel O'Quinn - Virginia President, 6th District, 1998 graduate

References

External links
Official Site

Public high schools in Virginia
Educational institutions established in 1960
Schools in Washington County, Virginia
1960 establishments in Virginia
Kingsport–Bristol metropolitan area